Gråkammen is a station on the Holmenkollen Line (Line 1) of the Oslo Metro. It is located between Gulleråsen and Slemdal. The station was opened on 31 May 1898 as part of the tramway to Besserud. It derives its name from the surrounding hillocks (Gråkammen is Norwegian for Grey Ridge).

References

Oslo Metro stations in Oslo
Railway stations opened in 1898
1898 establishments in Norway